Bubbaloo is a Latin American brand of bubble gum produced by Canderaria. They are small pieces of bubble gum with a liquid center.

Bubbaloo also contains BHT, an antioxidant food preservative.

Bubbaloo gum includes a variety of flavors,
some of them are: Mint, Blueberry March, Strawberry, Cherry, Cola, Green Apple, Grape, Banana, and Tutti Frutt.

History

Bubbaloo was the first bubblegum with a liquid center and made its debut in Mexican and Brazilian markets during the early-1980s. Today, Bubbaloo is sold in more than 25 countries and in three different continents across the world.

Trivia

Mixed-martial arts practitioner and UFC veteran Renato "Babalu" Sobral is nicknamed after Babalu Aye, the Orisha

Bubbaloo is mentioned in CNCO and Natti Natasha's single Honey Boo (2020) : "Honey boo, soy tu dulce como Bubaloo".

External links
 Official Bubbaloo site

Cadbury Adams brands
Mondelez International brands
Chewing gum
Fictional cats
Cat mascots